The 2004 Malé League was the fourth season of the Malé League.

League table

References
 Maldives 2004, Malé League at RSSSF

Football leagues in the Maldives
Maldives
Maldives
1